Abraham "Butch" Fatnowna (born 19 April 1974) is an Australian former rugby league footballer who played for Brisbane Broncos, Workington Town, London Broncos and Hunslet Hawks.

Fatnowna joined Workington in July 1996 during the inaugural Super League season. A year later, he joined London.

References

External links
Rugby League Project stats

1974 births
Living people
Australian rugby league players
Brisbane Broncos players
Hunslet R.L.F.C. players
London Broncos players
Place of birth missing (living people)
Rugby league fullbacks
Workington Town players